Federico Zuccaro, also known as Federico Zuccari (c. 1540/1541August 6, 1609), was an Italian Mannerist painter and architect, active both in Italy and abroad.

Biography
Zuccaro was born at Sant'Angelo in Vado, near Urbino (Marche).

His documented career as a painter began in 1550, when he moved to Rome to work under Taddeo, his elder brother. He went on to complete decorations for Pius IV, and help complete the fresco decorations at the Villa Farnese at Caprarola. Between 1563 and 1565, he was active in Venice with the Grimani family of Santa Maria Formosa. During his Venetian period, he traveled alongside Palladio in Friuli. He was involved in the following fresco projects:

 Decoration of the Casina Pio IV, Rome
 Grimani Chapel, San Francesco della Vigna, Venice
Monumental staircase, Palazzo Grimani, Venice
 Pucci Chapel in the church of Trinità dei Monti, Rome
 San Marcello al Corso, Rome
 Cathedral of Orvieto (1570)
 Oratorio del Gonfalone, Rome (1573)
 The Last Judgement on the ceiling of the dome of the Florence Cathedral. Started by Giorgio Vasari and unfinished at the time of his death, it was completed by Zuccari between 1576 and 1579 with the assistance of Bartolomeo Carducci, Domenico Passignano and Stefano Pieri.

Another picture in the same collection appears to be a replica of his painting of the "Allegory of Calumny", as suggested by Lucian's description of a celebrated work by Apelles; the satire in the original painting, directed against some of his courtier enemies, was the immediate cause of Zuccaro's temporary exile from Rome. Zuccaro was recalled to Rome by Pope Gregory XIII to continue in the Pauline chapel of the Vatican. He visited Brussels, and there made a series of cartoons for the tapestry-weavers. In 1574 he came to England, where he received a commission from Robert Dudley, Earl of Leicester to portray himself and Queen Elizabeth. He also painted Mary, Queen of Scots, Sir Nicholas Bacon, Sir Francis Walsingham, Lord High Admiral Howard.

He painted a portrait of a Man with Two Dogs, in the Pitti Palace (Florence), and the Dead Christ and Angels in the Galleria Borghese (Rome). In 1585, he accepted an offer by Philip II of Spain to decorate the new Escorial at a yearly salary of 2,000 crowns. He worked at the palace from January 1586 to end of 1588, when he returned to Rome. His paintings (like those of El Greco before him) were disliked by Philip II and many were painted over.  However the parting was amicable:"We must not blame him, but those who sent him to us", said Philip. He was succeeded by Pellegrino Tibaldi. He there founded in 1595, under a charter confirmed by Pope Sixtus V, the Accademia di San Luca, of which he was the first president. Bartolomeo Carducci is said to have studied with him. Between 1602 and 1604 he frescoed the hall of the Collegio Borromeo in Pavia together with Cesare Nebbia, a work commissioned by Cardinal Federico Borromeo.

Like Giorgio Vasari a generation before, Zuccaro aimed at being an art critic and historian. His chief book, L'idea de' Pittori, Scultori, ed Architetti (1607), was far less popular.

Zuccaro was raised to the rank of cavaliere not long before his death, which took place at Ancona in 1609.

References

Further reading

External links

 
 The Zuccaro Scholarship
 Getty Museum Exhibition Taddeo and Federico Zuccaro: Artist Brothers in Rome

1540s births
1609 deaths
People from the Province of Pesaro and Urbino
16th-century Italian painters
Italian male painters
17th-century Italian painters
Italian Mannerist painters
Artist authors
Sibling artists
Italian Mannerist architects
Catholic painters
Architects of Roman Catholic churches